Line Creek is a stream in Platte County in the U.S. state of Missouri.  It is a tributary of the Missouri River.

Line Creek was named for the fact its course flows parallel to the Clay—Platte county line.

References

Rivers of Platte County, Missouri
Rivers of Missouri